The 1980 Georgia Tech Yellow Jackets football team represented the Georgia Institute of Technology during the 1980 NCAA Division I-A football season. The Yellow Jackets were led by first-year head coach Bill Curry, and played their home games at Grant Field in Atlanta. Georgia Tech struggled mightily under Curry, finishing with one of the worst records in Georgia Tech history with 1 win, 9 losses, and 1 tie. A major highlight was achieved, however, when the Yellow Jackets produced a 3–3 tie against the number one team in the country, the undefeated Notre Dame Fighting Irish.

Schedule

Sources:

Roster

References

Georgia Tech
Georgia Tech Yellow Jackets football seasons
Georgia Tech Yellow Jackets football